Cherokee High School is located in Cherokee, Alabama and serves the western portion of Colbert County as part of the Colbert County School system.  It is located along County Road 21 (North Pike).

History
Cherokee High School was founded in 1925 as Cherokee Vocational High School as it was the first designated vocational school in Colbert County.  The school provides both academic and general diplomas and has dropped the "Vocational" part of the name.  The first graduating class consisted of 22 students. The most recent class (2012) consisted of 54 graduating students.

The original high school building was located where the current gymnasium stands.  As the school expanded with the end of segregation in 1968 the old high school became the junior high school.  That building burned on January 21, 1971.  The original segregated school for African Americans became Cherokee Middle School and contained grades 5 through 8.  That school closed at the end of the 2006/2007 school year and is being consolidated into Cherokee Elementary and Cherokee High Schools.

Athletics
Cherokee High School is a member of the Alabama High School Athletic Association Class 1A. The school colors are Blue and gold.  The school mascot is the "Indians".

Football
Cherokee High School has been notable for its sports teams through the years. Bud Mills (1950-1973, 1989), is a member of the Alabama Sports Hall of Fame. Mills had a career record of 152-81-4 during 25 years as a head coach. Garner Ezell (1983–85) led the Indians to Area Championships twice in three years, advancing to the Semi-finals in the 1984 season and the Quarter-finals in 1985. In 1985, the Indians recorded their first 12 win season while leading the area in most stats.
Gene Mitchell (1990-2001), led the Indians to 6 consecutive playoff appearances (1996-2001) and back to back Region Championships in 1998-99. 
In the 2015-2016 football season assistant principal, Lymos McDonald took over as head coach. The next season, he led the boys to the first round of the state playoffs in 14 years. In the first round of the playoffs the Indians fell to Suminton Christian. Coach Lymos McDonald  continues as head football coach now. 
In the 2017-2018 football season the Indians fought their way all the way to the 3rd round of the 1A State Playoffs before falling to Pickens County.

Baseball
From 1937 to 1950 not a lot has been found about Cherokee baseball. From 1951 to 1973 the school did not field a baseball team. Only the city league was available to the players. In 1974, Bud Mills started baseball again at the school and have fielded a team every year since then. Other than Mays and Mills, Brad Bradford and Richard Phillips are the only former coaches to this point to lead the Indians. Wade Turberville was the current coach of the Indians baseball team at that time.

Coach Richard Phillips, along with his long-time assistant Kenny Aycock, amassed 403 career victories in 29 years as the head coach. During those 29 years, he also led the Indians to 16 Area Championships and 19 Play-Off Appearances. Of those 19 appearances, 4 years ended in losses in the State Semi-finals, and 4 years ended as the State Runner-Up. 2002 was the last time the Indians made an appearance in the State Play-offs. They lost to Gordo in the State Semi-Finals during that year.

In 2017, Jerry Long and Scotty James took over the varsity boys team and led them to the first round of the state playoffs since 2002. They won the first round but fell to Cedar Bluff in the second round.

Basketball
The 2007-08 basketball team was ranked in the top 10 in the state for class 2A and led by long-time assistant Kenny Aycock.
The 2008-2009 team made it to the playoffs and was three games away from making it to the state championship.

Notable alumni

Senator Bobby Denton
Cecil Dowdy - University of Alabama football star during the coaching years of Paul "Bear" Bryant.
Bill Alexander, Auburn University basketball player 1967-70.

References

Public high schools in Alabama
Florence–Muscle Shoals metropolitan area
Educational institutions established in 1925
Schools in Colbert County, Alabama
Public middle schools in Alabama
1925 establishments in Alabama